Hołdunów is a district of Lędziny, Silesian Voivodeship, southern Poland. It was established in 1770 and merged with Lędziny in 1991. At the end of 2014 it had 5,399 inhabitants.

History 
The settlement was established in 1770 by about 300 Calvinists, fleeing religious persecution from the village of Kozy in the Polish–Lithuanian Commonwealth across the border to Upper Silesia in the Kingdom of Prussia. The refugees established a village on the fields of Lędziny's folwark Kiełpowy, called Anhalt, named after the rulers of a nearby Pless (Polish: Pszczyna). In 1778 they built a rectory, which housed a small chapel, school and lodging for a priest and a teacher.

The village was affected by the discovery of underground coal deposits in 1842, which led to the opening of a coal mine in the following year. In 1902 the Protestant Saint Trinity church was built in the municipality (razed in 1967). It was then inhabited by a majority of German-speakers. In Upper Silesia plebiscite (1921) Germany got 294 votes against 76 for Poland. Nonetheless Hołdunów became a part of Poland. In the interwar period it was one of only four municipalities in the Upper Silesian (thus excluding Cieszyn Silesia) part of autonomous Silesian Voivodeship which had Protestant majority (70.6% in 1933). It was later annexed by Nazi Germany at the beginning of World War II, and returned to Poland afterwards.

In 1975 Hołdunów together with Lędziny were amalgamated with Tychy. Lędziny regained town rights in 1991 and absorbed Hołdunów.

References

Neighbourhoods in Silesian Voivodeship
Bieruń-Lędziny County